Let's Die Forever... Together is a studio album by guitarist, vocalist and songwriter Eric McFadden released 2007. Though recorded mostly in the San Francisco Bay Area the original release was through Bad Reputation of France.

Track listing 
"Slow Lullaby (intro)"
"What's in My Head"
"I Break Everything I Touch"
"Did You Hear that Sound?"
"Never Go Home"
"Black Holidays"
"Sick Inside"
"Friend of a Friend"
"Practical Man"
"Hole in my Faith"
"Lucky You"
"Dead Man's Lullaby"
"Ship Without a Dock"
"Ric's Lullaby"

References 

2007 albums